Semitism may refer to:
 Semitism (linguistics), a grammatical or syntactical behaviour in a language which reveals that the influence of a Semitic language is present
Judaism 
Philosemitism
Semitic people

See also
 Antisemitism
 Semitic (disambiguation)